Ernst-Joachim Mestmäcker (born 25 September 1926) is a German lawyer. He was professor of private law at Georgetown University, Saarland University, University of Münster, University of Bielefeld, University of Hamburg, and University of Michigan, Ann Arbor. From 1984 to 1990 he was director of the German Max Planck Society. He is on the editorial board of the academic journal ORDO and member of the European Academy of Sciences and Arts. He is a member of the Mont Pelerin Society.

Awards
Mestmäcker was awarded the German Federal Cross of Merit, First Class, in 1981 as well as the order Pour le Mérite for accomplishments in the arts and sciences in 1997.

References

External links 

 

1926 births
Living people
20th-century German lawyers
Members of the European Academy of Sciences and Arts
Knights Commander of the Order of Merit of the Federal Republic of Germany
Recipients of the Pour le Mérite (civil class)
Academic staff of Bielefeld University
Academic staff of the University of Münster

University of Michigan faculty
Jurists from Saarland
German expatriates in the United States
Member of the Mont Pelerin Society
Max Planck Institute directors